Ilovice is a village in the municipalities of Trnovo, Republika Srpska and Trnovo FBIH, Bosnia and Herzegovina.

Demographics 
According to the 2013 census, its population was 17, all of them living in the Federation part thus none in the Republika Srpska part.

References

Populated places in Trnovo, Sarajevo
Populated places in Trnovo, Republika Srpska